Lough Rovers H&F GAA is a Gaelic Athletic Association club located on the Carrigrohane Rd., Cork, Ireland. The club fields teams in both hurling and Gaelic football.

Honours

 Cork Intermediate Hurling Championship (2): 1933, 1942
 Cork Junior Hurling Championship (1): 1932
 City Junior A Hurling Championship (4): 1932, 1948, 1952, 1959
 Cork Junior B Hurling Championship Runner-Up 2005,2019
 City Junior A Football Championship (1): 1986
 Cork Junior C Football Championship (2): 2017, 2020
 Craobh Rua Hurling Cup Champions (3) 1979, 1980, 2018

External links
Lough Rovers GAA site

Gaelic games clubs in County Cork
Gaelic football clubs in County Cork
Hurling clubs in County Cork